Kings University is a private university in Nigeria, founded in 2015 and located in the Odeomu area of Osun State. The university was established by the Kingsway International Christian Centre, a church-owned by Pastor Matthew Ashimolowo who also happens to be the Chancellor of Kings University.

Academic divisions 
From the establishment of Kings University in 2015, the university only had one faculty, but as of 2021, the university has now grown up to 3 faculties to their name. There are 

 Faculty of Humanities
 Faculty of Management and Social Science
 Faculty of Science

Vice chancellors 
 Professor Oladiran Famurewa (Left Office).
 Professor Adenike Kuku (Still in Office) 

The current Vice-Chancellor of Kings University is Professor Adenike Kuku, a Professor of Biochemistry, who assumed office in January 2021 following a successful 'acting position', while she was the acting Vice-Chancellor the previous year.

Achievement 
In December 2021, Kings University was ranked 31st best University in Nigeria, Kings University was also ranked 16th best amongst 99 private Universities in Nigeria.

References

External links
 

2015 establishments in Nigeria
Christian universities and colleges in Nigeria
Educational institutions established in 2015
Osun State
Universities and colleges in Nigeria